The Canadian Team Handball Federation, CTHF, is the governing body of team handball in Canada. It was founded in 1962 and joined the International Handball Federation the same year.

The CTHF is a member of the North America and the Caribbean Handball Confederation and the Commonwealth Handball Association. The CTHF is made up of the following voting member provinces: British Columbia, Alberta, Saskatchewan, Manitoba, Ontario, Quebec, New Brunswick, and Nova Scotia.

The CTHF sanctions three national tournaments each year for three categories, senior (22 and over), junior (21 and under), and juvenile (19 and under) both men and women subcategories exist within each age category. The tournaments are hosted and organized by one of the member provinces. The winner of the tournament is awarded the title of National Champions for the year until the tournament is held again.

National Teams 
The Canada men's and Women's senior national handball team competes under Pan-American Team Handball Federation (PATHF) Both teams have never qualified for their respective IHF World championships and Olympic Games. The men's team, lead by Patrick Combs, have competed in the Pan American games six times and the woman, led by Anne Hankins, have competed five times since Handball was introduced at the 1987 Pan am games in Indianapolis. The Men's team best finish is fourth in 1987 and 1991. The women's team best finish has been second three times in 1987, 1995 and 1999. There was no competition held for women in the 1991 edition of the tournament. Both teams are trying to qualify for the 2019 edition in Lima, Peru. Canada's men's team has won one silver and two bronze at the Pan American Men's Handball Championship.

Tournaments Hosted 

Canada has hosted the 1999 Pan Am Games handball tournament in Winnipeg, Manitoba and the 2015 Pan Am Games handball tournament in Toronto, Ontario. These events were hosted by the Canadian Olympic Committee not by the Canadian Team Handball Federation. However Canada Handball did get to attend because of automatic qualification.

See also 
 Canada men's national handball team
 Canada women's national handball team

References

External links
 

Handball in Canada
Handball governing bodies
Pan-American Team Handball Federation
Organizations based in Sherbrooke
Sports organizations established in 1962
1962 establishments in Quebec
Canada